Brigitte Fontaine is the fifth album by experimental French singer Brigitte Fontaine, released in 1972 on the Saravah label.

Track listing

On the 2002 CD re-release, Merry Go Round was replaced by an alternate version of the track L'Éternel Retour from the 1979 album Les églantines sont peut-être formidables.

1972 albums
Brigitte Fontaine albums